Lourdes and María de Lourdes are given names.

Notable people bearing these names include:
 Lourdes Alcorta (born 1951), a Peruvian politician
 Lourdes Becerra (born 1973), a Spanish swimmer and politician
 Lourdes Benedicto (born 1974), an American actress
 Lourdes Castrillo Brillantes, a Filipino writer
 Lourdes Maria Ciccone Leon, daughter of entertainer Madonna
 María de Lourdes Dieck-Assad, a Mexican economist
 Lourdes Domínguez Lino, a Spanish tennis player
 Lourdes Estores, an American glamour model
 Lourdes Flores, a Peruvian politician
 Lourdes Garcia-Navarro, an American journalist
 Lourdes Gourriel, Cuban baseball player and Olympic gold medalist
 Lourdes Gurriel Jr., a Major League baseball player
 Lourdes Hernández, a Spanish singer-songwriter 
 Lourdes Lucero, a fictional character from DC Comics
 Lourdes Maldonado (born 1973), Spanish journalist
 Lourdes Mendoza, a Peruvian politician
 Maria de Lurdes Mutola, an athlete from Mozambique
 Lourdes de Oliveira, Brazilian actress
 Lourdes Pangelinan (born 1974), director-general of the Secretariat of the Pacific Community 
 Lourdes Pérez, a Puerto Rican recording artist
Lourdes Valera, Venezuelan actress
 Maria de Lourdes Pintasilgo, a former prime minister of Portugal
 Lourdes Virginia Moran Poe (Lovi Poe), a Filipino actress
 Lourdes Portillo, a Mexican-American film director
 María de Lourdes Rojo e Incháustegui, a Mexican actress and politician
 María de Lourdes Santiago, a Puerto Rican politician
 Maria de Lourdes Pereira dos Santos Van-Dúnem (Lourdes Van-Dúnem), an Angolan singer
 Maria de Lourdes Villiers-Farrow (Mia Farrow), an American actress
 Maria Lourdes Sereno, Current Chief Justice of the Philippines and the first woman to hold the position

Fictional characters

 Lourdes Delgado was a main character and medical assistant in the television series Falling Skies played by Seychelle Gabriel.
The Groovy Girls doll line, by Manhattan Toy, features a doll named Lourdes.

Spanish feminine given names